The cuneiform sa sign is a less common-use sign of the Epic of Gilgamesh, the 1350 BC Amarna letters, and other cuneiform texts. It also has a sumerogrammic usage for SA in the Epic of Gilgamesh. The structure of the cuneiform sign is similar to, Ir (cuneiform), .

The "sa" sign has the syllabic usage for sa, and a Sumerogram usage for SA. Alphabetically "sa" can be used for s ("s" can be interchanged with any "z"); and "sa" can be used for a. In Akkadian, all 4 vowels, a, e, i, u are interchangeable with each other.

SA in the Epic of Gilgamesh is a logogram for Akkadian "Šer'ānu", translated as: "muscle, sinew".

Epic of Gilgamesh usage
The sa sign usage in the Epic of Gilgamesh is as follows: sa-(89 times); and SA-(2).

References

Moran, William L. 1987, 1992. The Amarna Letters. Johns Hopkins University Press, 1987, 1992. 393 pages.(softcover)
 Parpola, 1971. The Standard Babylonian Epic of Gilgamesh, Parpola, Simo, Neo-Assyrian Text Corpus Project, c 1997, Tablet I thru Tablet XII, Index of Names, Sign List, and Glossary-(pp. 119–145), 165 pages.

Cuneiform signs